Lieutenant Edgar George Davies  (4 November 1898 – 6 February 1919) was a British World War I flying ace credited with ten aerial victories.

Early life

Edgar George Davies was born on 4 November 1898 in London, England, in either Tufnell Park or Islington. He was working as a butcher when he enlisted in the Royal Field Artillery as a driver.

First World War service

Davies left school to join the Queen's Westminsters. From there, he transferred into the Royal Flying Corps (RFC) on 4 November 1917. He qualified as a pilot at the Grahame-White School on their proprietary airplanes, receiving his pilot's certificate on 11 May 1918. He was assigned to No. 29 Squadron RAF on 1 September 1918. The first of the nine enemy planes and one observation balloon that he destroyed fell on the 16th, and the last on 10 November, the day before the Armistice.

Postwar life

Davies died in a flying accident while serving in the Army of Occupation in Germany. He tried a high-speed roll over Bickendorf Airfield; his SE.5a shed its wings and he fell to his death.

Two days after his death on 6 February 1919, he was awarded his Distinguished Flying Cross. His Belgian Croix de guerre followed on 15 July 1919.

Edgar George Davies is buried in plot I.D.15, Cologne Southern Cemetery in Cologne, Germany.

Honours and awards
Distinguished Flying Cross (DFC)

2nd Lt. Edgar George Davies. (FRANCE)
   
Bold in attack and skilful in manoeuvre, this officer never hesitates to attack the enemy when opportunity occurs, without regard to disparity in numbers. On 7 October, with three other machines, he attacked seven Fokkers; four of these were destroyed, 2nd Lt. Davies accounting for one. Since 16 September he has to his credit four enemy machines and one kite balloon.

Footnotes

Sources of information

References
 Above the Trenches: a Complete Record of the Fighter Aces and Units of the British Empire Air Forces 1915–1920. Shores, Christopher F.; Franks, Norman & Guest, Russell F. Grub Street, 1990. .
SE 5/5a Aces of World War I. Norman Franks. Osprey Publishing, 2007. , 9781846031809.

1898 births
1919 deaths
Burials in Germany
British World War I flying aces
Recipients of the Distinguished Flying Cross (United Kingdom)
Recipients of the Croix de guerre (Belgium)
Aviators killed in aviation accidents or incidents in Germany
British Army personnel of World War I
Royal Field Artillery soldiers
Queen's Westminsters soldiers
Royal Flying Corps officers
Royal Air Force personnel of World War I
Military personnel from London